This article lists the complete results of the group stage of the 2014 Thomas Cup in New Delhi, India. All times are India Standard Time (UTC+05:30).

Group A

Indonesia vs Singapore

Thailand vs Nigeria

Thailand vs Singapore

Indonesia vs Nigeria

Indonesia vs Thailand

Nigeria vs Singapore

Group B

Denmark vs Hong Kong

Japan vs England

Denmark vs England

Japan vs Hong Kong

Japan vs Denmark

Hong Kong vs England

Group C

Malaysia vs India

Korea vs Germany

Korea vs India

Malaysia vs Germany

Malaysia vs Korea

Germany vs India

Group D

China vs France

Chinese Taipei vs Russia

China vs Russia

Chinese Taipei vs France

China vs Chinese Taipei

Russia vs France

References

External links
 Thomas Cup Finals 2014

2014 Thomas & Uber Cup